Japanese in Singapore may refer to:
Japanese occupation of Singapore
Japanese expatriates in Singapore
Japanese Cemetery Park of Singapore
Japanese language education in Singapore